Tore is an administrative area and one of the four Payams of Yei River County in Central Equatoria State of South Sudan. its located in the west of Yei which is the biggest town in the region and Service as the Administrative headquarter of Yei River County.

Geographical Location 
Tore is Located in Yei River County and West of the Yei. It boards Maridi County of Western Equatoria State

References 

Populated places in South Sudan